Bučje, which translates to Pumpkin from Serbo-Croatian, may refer to:

 Bučje, Čelić, a village in Bosnia and Herzegovina
 Bučje (Goražde), a village near Goražde, eastern Bosnia and Herzegovina
 Bučje (Srebrenica), a village in Bosnia and Herzegovina
 Bučje, Pleternica, a village near Pleternica in eastern Croatia
 Bučje, Pakrac, a village near Pakrac in eastern Croatia
 Bučje (Bor), a village in eastern Serbia
 Bučje (Knjaževac), a village in eastern Serbia
 Bučje (Priboj), a village in western Serbia
 Bučje (Trstenik), a village in central Serbia

See also
 Ravno Bučje (disambiguation)